The Saracen Blade is a 1954 American adventure film directed by William Castle and starring Ricardo Montalbán, Betta St. John and Rick Jason. The film was produced and distributed by Columbia Pictures. It is based on the 1952 bestselling novel of the same name by Frank Yerby. It is set in Italy at the time of the Crusades, when great families made war on each other between trips to the Holy Land.

Cast
 Ricardo Montalbán as Pietro Donati
 Betta St. John as Iolanthe Rogliano
 Rick Jason as Enzio Siniscola
 Carolyn Jones as Elaine of Siniscola
 Whitfield Connor as Frederick II
 Michael Ansara as Count Alesandro Siniscola
 Edgar Barrier as Baron Rogliano
 Nelson Leigh as Isaac
 Pamela Duncan as Zenobia
 Guy Prescott as Donati (as Frank Pulaski)

Production
Castle said "it was a herculean task for me to adhere to the schedule of the movie... for three years I had been up to my ass in queens, kings and jokers" but he enjoyed working with Montalban.

References

External links

1954 films
1950s historical adventure films
American historical adventure films
Columbia Pictures films
Crusades films
Films based on American novels
Films directed by William Castle
Films set in the 13th century
Films set in Italy
1950s English-language films
1950s American films